Kwajo "Cinqo" Boateng—known by stage name Kwajo Cinqo—is an artist, producer, CEO and member of two-time Juno Award-winning hip-hop group Ghetto Concept. Initially beginning his career in 1992 alongside Dolo (Lowell Frazer) and Infinite (Desmond Francis), who was introduced as a new member in 1994, Kwajo is now the President and CEO of Global 7 Entertainment Inc. (G7). He is also an artist/producer under G7 Records—a subsidiary of Global 7 Entertainment Inc..

Career
Prior to founding Global 7 Entertainment in 2010, Kwajo founded 7Bills Entertainment in 1996. The company showcased artists such as Angel Duss, Blacks, and Ray Smoove and released the albums Ghetto Concept (1998) and Ghetto Concept Presents…7Bills All-Stars: Da Album (2002). Both compilations featured collaborations with artists including Snow, Maestro, Kardinal Official, Red-1, Ironside, and Sticky Fingaz—American rapper, actor and member of hip-hop group Onyx.

In 2004 Kwajo co-scored the Soul Plane movie soundtrack as a producer and writer for singles "Full Grown", "Kitty Cat", "Strobelight", "Yourz Iz Mine", and "Here We Go Again". The soundtrack also featured singles by Snoop Dogg, R. Kelly, Nelly, and Lil Scrappy. Pursuing other aspects of the entertainment industry, Kwajo has also been a part of Playboy TV’s Red & Meth: How to Throw A Party At The PlayBoy Mansion (2005), starring rappers Redman and Method Man. He has worked alongside Run-DMC, Brand Nubian, and Eminem  and executive produced Reema Major’s I Am Legend mixtape (2011) and JJ Money’s Time Is Money mixtape (2011).

On March 22, 2011, Kwajo reunited with fellow group member Dolo of Ghetto Concept to perform at CBC’s Hip-Hop Summit which featured other legendary Canadian hip-hop artists including Michie Mee, K-Os, Dream Warriors, and Maestro. Kwajo also appeared in Love, Props and the T.Dot—a hip-hop documentary hosted by Dwight Drummond of CBC Toronto, where he was recognized for his significant contributions to Canadian hip hop.

Gold Cedi Goldfields Ltd.
With music at the core of Kwajo’s longstanding career, he has propelled his career in the corporate sector with Gold Cedi Goldfields Ltd. (GCG)—a subsidiary of Ashanti Minerals Group. The company is headquartered in Toronto but is also stationed in British Columbia, and internationally in Ghana, Kwajo’s country of ethnicity. GCG has provided employment and support for Ghanaian locals, and has administered scholarship funding for Ghanaian students to further their education in Canada.

Music

Discography

Ghetto Concept
"Certified" (1993) - Single
"E-Z on Tha Motion" (1994) - Single
"Much Love" (1996) - Single
Ghetto Concept (1998) - Album
Ghetto Concept Presents…7Bills All-Stars: Da Album (2002)
"Here We Go Again" feat. Lil' Flip (2004) - Single

Kwajo Cinqo
Corporate Hustle (2011)

Awards
1995: Juno Award for Rap Recording of the Year — "Certified" - Ghetto Concept
1996: Juno Award for Rap Recording of the Year — "EZ On Tha Motion" - Ghetto Concept
2000: Canadian Gold Certification — "Too Much" - Ghetto Concept/Baby Blue Soundcrew

References

External links 
 Official Website

Year of birth missing (living people)
Living people
Black Canadian musicians
Musicians from Vancouver
Rappers from Toronto
Canadian people of Ghanaian descent
Canadian hip hop record producers
Canadian male rappers
20th-century Canadian rappers
21st-century Canadian rappers
20th-century Canadian male musicians
21st-century Canadian male musicians